"Everybody's Gone to War" is a song written and performed by London-born, Jersey-raised singer-songwriter Nerina Pallot. The song, an anti-war protest, was written during the early stages of the Iraq War in 2003 and was composed on bass guitar by Pallot. Originally distributed as a promotional CD in 2004, the song was commercially issued as the third single from Pallot's second album, Fires, on 22 May 2006, reaching number 14 on the UK Singles Chart the same month.

The accompanying music video features Pallot and other shoppers engaging in a 'food fight' in a busy supermarket. Directed by Marc Klasfeld, it received heavy rotation on British music channels with many people praising the humorous setting despite depicting a darker message within.

Chart performance
After the album proved a commercial flop, Nerina Pallot toured as a support act for an array of other artists, and in 2006, she was signed to 14th Floor Records, impressed by reaction to her live sets. They reissued the album to greater success in the spring, and released "Everybody's Gone to War" as a commercial single on 22 May 2006, on the back of performances on Top of the Pops and GMTV. The single charted at number 37 on download sales alone and jumped to number 14 the following week, making it Pallot's highest chart peak in the UK.

Track listings
UK CD and 7-inch single
 "Everybody's Gone to War" – 3:54
 "Mr. King" – 4:22

Australian CD single
 "Everybody's Gone to War" – 3:54
 "Mr. King" – 4:22
 "Everybody's Gone to War" (strings version) – 3:53

Credits and personnel
Credits are lifted from the UK 7-inch single sleeve.

Studios
 Recorded at Sage and Sound (Los Angeles), Eastcote Studios, and Nerina's House (London, England)
 Mixed at Resonate Studios (Los Angeles)
 Mastered at Sterling Sound (New York City)

Personnel

 Nerina Pallot – writing, vocals, backing vocals, electric guitar, piano, additional recording, artwork illustrations
 Susannah Melvoin – backing vocals
 Lyle Workman – guitar
 Tim Van der Kuil – guitar, bass guitar
 Roger Manning Jr. – Hammond B3
 Kevin Churko – keyboards
 Damon Wilson – drums
 Lenny Castro – percussion
 Howard Willing – production, recording, programming
 Chris Lord-Alge – mixing
 Keith Armstrong – mixing assistant
 Dmitar "Dim E" Krnjaic – mixing assistant
 Ted Jensen – mastering
 www.wearetourist.com – artwork design
 Melanie Nissen – photography

Charts

Weekly charts

Year-end charts

Release history

See also
 List of anti-war songs

References

14th Floor Records singles
2006 singles
Anti-war songs
Music videos directed by Marc Klasfeld
Nerina Pallot songs
Songs written by Nerina Pallot